Anopheles insulaeflorum is a species complex of mosquito belonging to the genus Anopheles. It is found in India, Sri Lanka, Cambodia, China, Indonesia, Malaysia, Myanmar, Philippines, Taiwan, Thailand, and Vietnam.

References

insulaeflorum
Insects described in 1919